Southlander is a 2001 American independent film by Steve Hanft and Ross Harris.

Southlander may also refer to:
Southlanders, people of the Southland, New Zealand
The Southlanders, Jamaican-British band 1950s onwards

See also
Southland (disambiguation)